NGC 7081 is a spiral galaxy located about 130 million light-years away in the constellation of Aquarius. NGC 7081 was discovered by astronomer William Herschel on October 10, 1790.

See also 
 List of NGC objects (7001–7840)

References

External links 
 

Spiral galaxies
Aquarius (constellation)
7081
11759
66891
Astronomical objects discovered in 1790